TCDD MT5600 branded as Sakarya is a series of 11 diesel railcars operated by the Turkish State Railways. They were produced by Tüvasaş.

External links
 Tüvasaş page on MT5600 
 Trains on Turkey page on MT5600

Turkish State Railways railcars